Courtnay is both a surname and given name. Notable people with the name include:

Courtnay (Sussex cricketer), English cricketer
Frank Courtnay (1903–1980), Australian politician
Courtnay Pilypaitis (born 1988), Canadian basketball player and coach